William Soden Hastings (June 3, 1798 – June 17, 1842) was a United States representative from Massachusetts.

Life and career
Born in Mendon, Massachusetts, his father was Seth Hastings, also a U.S. Representative. On his father's side of the family, he was a descendant of Thomas Hastings (colonist) who came from the East Anglia region of England to the Massachusetts Bay Colony in 1634. The younger Hastings completed preparatory studies and graduated from Harvard University in 1817; he studied law, was admitted to the bar in 1820 and commenced practice in Mendon.

Hastings became a member of the Massachusetts House of Representatives in 1828, and served in the Massachusetts State Senate from 1829 to 1833.
He was elected as a Whig to the Twenty-fifth, Twenty-sixth, and Twenty-seventh Congresses, serving from March 4, 1837, until his death in 1842. He died in Red Sulphur Springs, Virginia (now West Virginia) and was buried in Old Cemetery, Mendon.

See also
List of United States Congress members who died in office (1790–1899)

References

Buckminster, Lydia N.H., The Hastings Memorial, A Genealogical Account of the Descendants of Thomas Hastings of Watertown, Mass. from 1634 to 1864, Boston: Samuel G. Drake Publisher (an undated NEHGS photoduplicate of the 1866 edition).

External links
 Descendants of Thomas Hastings website
 Descendants of Thomas Hastings on Facebook

1798 births
1842 deaths
People from Mendon, Massachusetts
Members of the Massachusetts House of Representatives
Massachusetts state senators
Harvard University alumni
Whig Party members of the United States House of Representatives from Massachusetts
19th-century American politicians